In Da Mix is the debut studio album by trance duo Blank & Jones. It was released in 1999.

Track listing
"On A Journey" (Intro) – 1:52
"Cream" – 7:00
"Flying To The Moon" (Moonman Remix) – 5:53
"Wake Up" – 4:56
"Strong" – 6:15
"B-Boy-Style" – 5:02
"Nice & Warm" – 5:50
"Heartbeat" – 6:49
"Sugardaddy" – 7:32
"After Love" – 7:28
"Out Of Here" (Outro) – 1:26
"Flying To The Moon" (Short) – 3:28
"Heartbeat" (Short) – 3:30
"Cream" (Short) – 3:15
"After Love" (Short) – 3:27

Blank & Jones albums
1999 debut albums